The 2013 ANZAC test (also known as the VB Test due to sponsorship by Victoria Bitter) was the 14th annual Anzac test, and was not only the first time the Australian Kangaroos played at Canberra Stadium, but the first time they had played in the Australia's capital city. They defeated New Zealand 32-12 in the Test match which was played on 19 April 2013 before a crowd of 25,628.

Squads

Roger Tuivasa-Sheck was selected as New Zealand's 18th man.

Match Summary

See also

References

External links

Anzac Test
Rugby league in the Australian Capital Territory
International rugby league competitions hosted by Australia
Sports competitions in Canberra
2010s in Canberra
Anzac Test
Anzac Test
Anzac Test